This is a list of schools in Kwun Tong District, Hong Kong.

Secondary schools

 Government
 Kwun Tong Government Secondary School (觀塘官立中學)
 Kwun Tong Kung Lok Government Secondary School (觀塘功樂官立中學)

 Aided
 Buddhist Ho Nam Kam College (佛教何南金中學)
 CCC Kei Chi Secondary School (中華基督教會基智中學)
 CCC Mong Man Wai College (中華基督教會蒙民偉書院)
 FDBWA Szeto Ho Secondary School (五邑司徒浩中學)
 HK SKH Bishop Hall Secondary School (香港聖公會何明華會督中學)
 HKTA Ching Chung Secondary School (香港道教聯合會青松中學)
 HKWMA Chu Shek Lun Secondary School (香港布廠商會朱石麟中學)
 Ko Lui Secondary School (高雷中學)
 Kwun Tong Maryknoll College (觀塘瑪利諾書院)
 Leung Shek Chee College (梁式芝書院)
 Maryknoll Secondary School (瑪利諾中學)
 Mission Covenant Church Holm Glad College (基督教聖約教會堅樂中學)
 Ning Po College (寧波公學)
 Ning Po No. 2 College (寧波第二中學)
 NLSI Lui Kwok Pat Fong College (新生命教育協會呂郭碧鳳中學)
 Po Chiu Catholic Secondary School (天主教普照中學)
 Shun Lee Catholic Secondary School (順利天主教中學)
 Sing Yin Secondary School (聖言中學)
 SKH Kei Hau Secondary School (聖公會基孝中學)
 SKH Leung Kwai Yee Secondary School (聖公會梁季彜中學)
 St Antonius Girls' College (聖安當女書院)
 St Catharine's School for Girls (聖傑靈女子中學)
 St Joseph's Anglo-Chinese School (聖若瑟英文中學)
 St Paul's School (Lam Tin) (藍田聖保祿中學)
 Yan Chai Hospital Law Chan Chor Si College (仁濟醫院羅陳楚思中學)

 Direct Subsidy Scheme
 Delia Memorial School (Hip Wo No. 2 College) (地利亞修女紀念學校（協和二中）)
 Delia Memorial School (Hip Wo) (地利亞修女紀念學校（協和）)
 ECF Saint Too Canaan College (基督教中國佈道會聖道迦南書院)
 Fukien Secondary School (福建中學)
 Mu Kuang English School (慕光英文書院)
 United Christian College (Kowloon East) (滙基書院（東九龍）)

 Private
 Kellett School
 Nord Anglia International School, HK
 Shema Academy (示昕學校)

Primary schools

 Government
 Kwun Tong Government Primary School (Sau Ming Road) (觀塘官立小學〈秀明道〉)
 Kwun Tong Government Primary School (觀塘官立小學)

 Aided
 Bishop Paschang Catholic School (天主教柏德學校)
 Buddhist Chi King Primary School (佛教慈敬學校)
 C&MA Sun Kei Primary School (Ping Shek) (基督教宣道會宣基小學（坪石）)
 Carmel Leung Sing Tak School (迦密梁省德學校)
 CCC Kei Faat Primary School (中華基督教會基法小學)
 CCC Kei Faat Primary School (Yau Tong) (中華基督教會基法小學（油塘）)
 Conservative Baptist Lui Ming Choi Primary School (浸信宣道會呂明才小學)
 HK Taoist Association Wun Tsuen School (香港道教聯合會雲泉學校)
 HKTAYYI Chan Lui Chung Tak Memorial School (香港道教聯合會圓玄學院陳呂重德紀念學校)
 Jordan Valley St Joseph's Catholic Primary School (佐敦谷聖若瑟天主教小學)
 Kowloon Bay St John the Baptist Catholic Primary School (九龍灣聖若翰天主教小學)
 Lam Tin Methodist Primary School (藍田循道衛理小學)
 Lok Sin Tong Yeung Chung Ming Primary School (樂善堂楊仲明學校)
 Lok Wah Catholic Primary School (樂華天主教小學)
 Man Kiu Association Primary School (閩僑小學)
 Mission Convent Church Holm Glad No. 2 Primary School (基督教聖約教會堅樂第二小學)
 Mission Convent Church Holm Glad Primary School (基督教聖約教會堅樂小學)
 Our Lady of China Catholic Primary School (天主教佑華小學)
 Ping Shek Estate Catholic Primary School (坪石天主教小學)
 S. K. H. Yautong Kei Hin Primary School (聖公會油塘基顯小學)
 Sau Mau Ping Catholic Primary School (秀茂坪天主教小學)
 Sau Ming Primary School (秀明小學)
 SKH Kei Hin Primary School (聖公會基顯小學)
 SKH Kei Lok Primary School (聖公會基樂小學)
 SKH Kowloon Bay Kei Lok Primary School (聖公會九龍灣基樂小學)
 SKH Lee Shiu Keung Primary School (聖公會李兆強小學)
 SKH St John's Tsang Shiu Tim Primary School (聖公會聖約翰曾肇添小學)
 SKH Tak Tin Lee Shiu Keung Primary School (聖公會德田李兆強小學)
 St Antonius Primary School (聖安當小學)
 St Edward's Catholic Primary School (聖愛德華天主教小學)
 St John the Baptist Catholic Primary School (聖若翰天主教小學)
 St Matthews Lutheran School (Sau Mau Ping) (路德會聖馬太學校（秀茂坪）)

 Direct Subsidy Scheme
 Fukien Secondary School Affiliated School (福建中學附屬學校)

 Private
 Kellett School
 Nord Anglia International School Hong Kong
 Shema Academy
 St Joseph's Anglo-Chinese Primary School (聖若瑟英文小學)

Special schools

 Aided
 Caritas Mother Teresa School (明愛樂恩學校)
 CCC Kei Shun Special School (中華基督教會基順學校)
 Evangelize China Fellowship Holy Word School (基督教中國佈道會聖道學校)
 Hong Kong Red Cross Princess Alexandria School (香港紅十字會雅麗珊郡主學校)
 Hong Kong Red Cross Hospital Schools United Christian Hospital (香港紅十字會醫院學校)
 Society of Boys' Centres Shing Tak Centre School (香港扶幼會盛德中心學校)

References

Lists of schools in Hong Kong
Kwun Tong District